Sara Errani was the defending champion, but chose to compete in Palermo instead.
Simona Halep won the title, defeating Yvonne Meusburger in the final, 6–3, 6–7(7–9), 6–1.

Seeds

Draw

Finals

Top half

Bottom half

References 
 Main draw

2013 Singles
Budapest Grand Prix - Singles